Barceló is a Spanish and Catalan surname.

Barceló may also refer to:

Barceló (rum), a Dominican rum distillery
Barceló Hotels, a multinational resort chain
Barcelo (grape), a Portuguese wine grape
USS Barcelo (IX-199), an auxiliary ship of the United States Navy
USS Barcelo (YT-105), a yard tug of the United States Navy

See also 
 Barsalou (surname)